Vanice Palmer (born August 5, 1993), known professionally as Cookiee Kawaii, is an American singer. She is best known for her song "Vibe (If I Back It Up)", which became popular on TikTok in 2020. After the song went viral, she signed to Empire, and released her debut studio album, Vanice, in 2021.

Life and career
Vanice Palmer was born on August 5, 1993, and raised in Irvington, New Jersey. Her parents are both DJs, who mostly played Chicago house music. She attended Catholic school, where she performed in choirs. At age 12, she began writing poetry and performing her poems over beats and in 2011, she started making her own music. She worked various jobs, including as a exotic dancer and a delivery driver for DoorDash and Uber Eats. While she was homeless and living out of her car, she worked as a live-in caregiver.

She began making music under the name Harajuku Cookiee, before changing it to Cookiee Kawa, and finally to Cookiee Kawaii, inspired by her love of cookies and anime. She released her debut project, Zen, in 2016. In July 2019, she released her debut mixtape Club Soda, Vol. 1. In February 2020, her breakout single, "Vibe (If I Back It Up)", went viral on TikTok after originally being released in March 2019, and was called one of the best songs of 2020 by Noisey and Vulture. 

She signed to Empire in March 2020, and released her second mixtape Club Soda, Vol. 2 in August 2020, which included "Vibe (If I Back It Up)". She released an animated music video for "Vibe (If I Back It Up)" in May 2020, a live-action music video for the song in August 2020, and a remix of the song featuring Tyga alongside a music video, also in August 2020. She released the single "Relax Your Mind" in May 2021. Her debut studio album, Vanice, was released on July 30, 2021 through Empire, preceded by the single "Press Play (Gamer Girl)".

Musical style
Cookiee Kawaii's music has primarily been described as Jersey club. Early in her career, she made mostly R&B music, but began making Jersey club music per a suggestion from DJ Jayhood, with whom she made her first Jersey club song. Kadish Morris described her music as feeling "fluorescent, high-energy and made for partying". She has cited Missy Elliott as an influence.

Personal life
Cookiee Kawaii is pansexual. Before signing with Empire, she was studying business and marketing at Essex County College. As of 2020, she lives in East Orange, New Jersey.

Discography

Studio albums

Extended plays

Mixtapes

Singles

As lead artist

As featured artist

Other charted songs

References

External links

1993 births
People from Irvington, New Jersey
21st-century American women singers
21st-century American singers
African-American women singers
Jersey club musicians
American contemporary R&B singers
Electronic dance music musicians
American LGBT singers
Singers from New Jersey
LGBT people from New Jersey
Pansexual musicians
Living people
21st-century American LGBT people